George Stuart Ellis (7 September 1932 – 17 January 2023) was an athlete who competed for England.

Athletics career
Ellis represented England in the sprint disciplines at the 1954 British Empire and Commonwealth Games in Vancouver, Canada.

Ellis won three medals at the 1954 European Athletics Championships in Bern and was the British number one during 1954.

Death
Ellis died on 17 January 2023, at the age of 90.

References

1932 births
2023 deaths
Athletes (track and field) at the 1954 British Empire and Commonwealth Games
Commonwealth Games competitors for England
English male sprinters